Zemeyevo (Yämäy) is a rural locality (a village) in Chekmagushevsky District, Bashkortostan, Russia. The population was 130 as of 2010. There is 1 street.

Geography 
Zemeyevo is located 23 km north of Chekmagush (the district's administrative centre) by road. Imyanlikulevo is the nearest rural locality.

References 

Rural localities in Chekmagushevsky District